Ed Gettemeier is a retired American soccer goalkeeper who played professionally in the North American Soccer League and Major Indoor Soccer League.

Youth
Gettemeier attended Southern Illinois University Edwardsville where he played on the men's soccer team from 1979 to 1982.  In 1979, he was the winning goalkeeper in SIUE's National Championship victory over Clemson University played in Tampa Stadium.  In 1980 and 1981 Gettemeier was a member of the Busch Soccer Club Team that won two consecutive National Titles in the United States Soccer Federation's Open Cup Championships.  He was a 1982 Second Team All American.

Professional
In 1983, Gettemeier turned professional with the Montreal Manic of the North American Soccer League.  He was named the teams "Players Player of the Year" due to a stretch run in the playoffs where he earned a number of defensive player of the game honors.  The highlight of the season came when Montreal upset the NASL power New York Cosmos winning in New York and then again in a shootout in Montreal.  Unfortunately for Gettemeier the Manic folded and his contract was purchased by the Chicago Sting.  In 1984, he was a member of the Soccer Bowl Champion Chicago Sting.  Unhappy with his playing time Gettemeier requested to be released from his contract. The Sting released him in October 1984.  He then signed as a free agent with the St. Louis Steamers of the Major Indoor Soccer League.  He played two seasons (one year contract plus one year option) with the Steamers and became a free agent at the end of the 1985–1986 season when the Steamers and Gettemeier could not agree to contract terms.  In July 1986, he joined the Kansas City Comets. He played for the Comets until 1989.

In 1989, Gettemeier became the goalkeeper coach with Southern Illinois University Edwardsville.  In 2008 Gettemeier was inducted into the SIUE Athletics Hall of Fame.  In 2011 Gettemeier was inducted into the St. Louis Soccer Hall of Fame. In that same year Gettemeier earned his Doctorate of Educational Leadership from Lindenwood University.  

In 2020 Dr. Ed Gettemeier retired from Hardin Middle School after serving as a school principal of the St. Charles School District for 11 years. Dr. Gettemeier earned a number of honors while in public education including St. Charles School District Administrator of the Year, St. Louis Middle School Principal of the Year and Missouri Middle School Principal of the Year.  Dr. Gettemeier served 7 years on the Missouri Association of Secondary School Principals Board of Directors including serving as President of MoASSP in 2018–2019. Dr. Gettemeier is currently an adjunct professor at Lindenwood University in the Educational Leadership/Administration program.

References

External links
NASL/MISL stats

1959 births
Living people
American soccer coaches
American soccer players
American expatriate soccer players
Association football goalkeepers
Chicago Sting (NASL) players
Expatriate soccer players in Canada
Kansas City Comets (original MISL) players
Major Indoor Soccer League (1978–1992) players
Montreal Manic players
NCAA Division I Men's Soccer Tournament Most Outstanding Player winners
North American Soccer League (1968–1984) players
North American Soccer League (1968–1984) indoor players
SIU Edwardsville Cougars men's soccer players
St. Louis Steamers (original MISL) players
Soccer players from St. Louis